The Labeatae, Labeatai or Labeates were an Illyrian people that lived on the Adriatic coast of southern Illyria, between modern Albania and Montenegro, around Lake Scodra (the ancient Lacus Labeatis).

Their territory, which was called Labeatis in classical antiquity, seems to have stretched from Lissus at the river Drin in the south, or probably even from the valley of Mat, up to Meteon in the north. Their centre and main stronghold was Skodra, which during the last period of the Illyrian kingdom was the capital city. The Labeatan kingdom was also in possession of Rhizon, the Ardiean capital.

The dynasty of the last Illyrian kings (Scerdilaidas, Pleuratus, Gentius) was Labeatan. It is possible that the decline of the Ardiaean dynasty after Queen Teuta's defeat in the First Illyrian War against Rome caused the emergence of the Labeatan dynasty on the political scene. In Roman times the Labeatae minted coins bearing the inscription of their ethnicon.

Name

Attestation 

The name is attested for the first time in The Histories by Polybius (2nd century BC), who mentioned the region  . Livy in his Ab Urbe Condita Libri mentioned several times the tribal name Labeatae, the region Labeatis and palus Labeatis/lacus Labeatum (Lake Scodra). Coins bearing the inscription of the ethnicon ΛΑΒΙΑΤΑΝ have been found in northern Albania.

Etymology 
The name of the Labeatae is formed by the Lab- particle which is frequently found in the southern Illyrian onomastic area and the common Illyrian suffix -at(ae). The Lab- particle represents a metathesis from Alb- > Lab-, which itself could be related to the appearance of the ethnonym of the Albanians in the same area. It is present in hydronyms like the Lab river and toponyms like Llapashticë along the later Roman route from Lissus to Ulpiana and indicates the movement of Illyrian tribes from the interior of Illyria to the coastline or vice versa.

Geography 

Unlike other Illyrian tribes, the extent of the territory of the Labeatae can be determined with relative precision through some important literary informations from ancient sources. In the accounts of the Roman-Illyrian war involving Gentius, Livy ( 1st century BC – 1st century AD) described the location of Skodra reporting that the Illyrian king was ruler of the Labeatae and referring to the Lake Shkodra as Lacus Labeatium. The core of the Labeatan territory must therefore have been the area around this lake. The Labeatan king Genthius was also in possession of Rhizon, the capital of the Ardiaean kingdom.

In the description of the place where the envoy of Gentius and Perseus met in 168 BC, Polybius ( 2nd century BC) reports that the site of Meteon was located in the territory of the Labeatae. It was there that the Illyrian and Macedonian kings established an alliance against the Romans. Livy mentions Meteon as a "city of the Labeates", where at the end of the war Gentius' wife Etleuta, their two sons, and Gentius' brother Caravantius took refuge, implying that this city belonged to Labeatan territory until it was conquered by the Romans. Meteon can be considered as the northern border of Labeatan territory, beyond which Docleatan territory began encompassing the area between the rivers Zeta and Morača. In the west the territory of Labeatae was bordered by the Adriatic sea, its eastern border was presumably marked by the Accursed Mountains. The southern border may be considered the site of Lissus at the mouth of the river Drin, or further south the mouth of the river Mat, beyond which stretched the region of the Taulantii. In Roman times Lissus was located in the territory of the Labeatae, however ancient sources never relate it with this tribe. Taking into account archaeological and historical considerations, the city of Lissus should have been founded in a Labeatan ethnos context, but perhaps by the time of queen Teuta's fall in the end of the 3rd century BC, it was organized as a proper polis separating from the context of the ethnos.

The territory of the Labeatae comprised a number of relevant rivers, including Drin (Oriund), Buna (Barbana), Kiri (Klausali) and Morača, and the alluvial plains surrounding the Lake Shkodra (Lacus or Palus Labeatis). However, the only navigable rivers in antiquity were Buna and Drin.

After the Roman conquest of southern Illyria, the territory of the Illyrian realm of Gentius was separated into three parts. One of these areas coincided with the Labeatan region.

Culture

Language 

The idiom spoken by the tribe of Labeatae belonged to the southeastern Illyrian linguistic area.

Religion 

Several cult-objects with similar features are found in different Illyrian regions, including the territory of the Illyrian tribes of Labeatae, Dassaretii, Daorsi, and comprising also the Iapodes. In particular, a 3rd century BC silvered bronze belt buckle, found inside the Illyrian Tombs of Selça e Poshtme near the western shore of Lake Lychnidus in Dassaretan territory, depicts a scene of warriors and horsemen in combat, with a giant serpent as a protector totem of one of the horsemen; a very similar belt was found also in the necropolis of Gostilj near the Lake Scutari in the territory of the Labeatae, indicating a common hero-cult practice in those regions. Modern scholars suggest that the iconographic representation of the same mythological event includes the Illyrian cults of the serpent, of Cadmus, and of the horseman, the latter being a common Paleo-Balkan hero. The cult of the serpent among the Labeatae is reflected also on their coinage: ships depicted with figureheads of serpents are often engraved on Labeatan coins. The serpents depicted on ships were related to the beliefs of the sailors that these animal totems would have safeguarded them from storms and enemies. The serpent was a powerful symbol among southern Illyrians, who attributed it an important role as a protector animal.

Economy 

The Labeates minted coins around the 2nd century BC. Coins bearing the inscription of the ethnicon ΛΑΒΙΑΤΑΝ (LABIATAN) have been found in northern Albania. Illyrian light ships (lembus, pl. lembi) are often engraved on Labeatan coins, sometimes depicted with figureheads of serpents.

During his reign, the Illyrian king Gentius adopted economic measures which are well testified by archaeological finds. He developed a new system of coinage in the territory of his political entity. He allowed to mint coins to the cities of Skodra, Lissus, Rhizon and Lychnidus, allowing it also to the Labeatae and Daorsi, two of the most important Illyrian ethnics of the region at that time. This system considerably expanded the circulation of coins reaching even the deepest areas of the kingdom.

Gentius centralized the production of the coins, interrupting the old minting of Skodra, and starting the production of new coins, which, instead of the engraving of Zeus, adopted the portrait of the king, while on the reverse continued bearing the typical engraving of the Illyrian ship (lembus), but the name of the king was engraved on them instead of the legend of the city. Thus Gentius had evidently removed monetary autonomy from the city of Skodra, and transformed the mint of Skodra's koinon into a royal mint.

Gentius allowed other communities like Lissus, Labeatae and Daorsi to mint coins with the names of their koinon or ethnos, but nevertheless obliged them to respect the state standard, that was to engrave in the coins the portrait of the king and the Illyrian light ships. In addition, the coins of all these political entities had to respect the same size and weight as the coins produced in the royal mint of Skodra.

Coins bearing the ethnicon of the Labeatae were minted also during the Roman period. These coins are mainly found on the mountainous area surrounding Skodra.

See also 

List of ancient Illyrian peoples and tribes
List of ancient tribes in Illyria

References

Bibliography 

Illyrian tribes
Illyrian Albania
Illyrian Montenegro
Ancient tribes in Albania
Ancient tribes in Montenegro